aka Night Train Woman is a 1972 Japanese film in Nikkatsu's Roman porno series, directed by Noboru Tanaka and starring Mari Tanaka.

Synopsis
Saeko is abnormally attached to her older sister, Yumi. When Yumi becomes engaged to Arikawa, Saeko schemes to separate the two. She seduces Arikawa who then becomes confused over his attraction to both sisters. He approaches their father about his dilemma. The father explains that the two are actually half-sisters, Saeko being the result of his affair with Tomoko, a family maid. After Arikawa explains this to the sisters, Saeko's obsession with Yumi seems to end. However, when Yumi and Arikawa leave for a vacation together, Saeko follows them on the night train. When she catches up to them, she kills her sister with a razor blade and then kills herself.

Cast
 Mari Tanaka as Saeko Mizuki
 Keiko Tsuzuki as Yumi Mizuki
 Tomoko Katsura as Hiroko
 Kibaji Tankoba as Okajima
 Akemi Yamaguchi as Mika
 Keisuke Yukioka as Hajime Mizuki
 Toshihiko Oda as Yōji Arikawa
 Hidetoshi Kageyama as Gorō
 Hiroyuki Mikawa as Kishibe

Critical appraisal
During Woman on the  Night Train'''s
Japanese critics noted the influence of European filmmakers on Tanaka's style. 
The use of metaphor and symbolism in the film was said to be similar to some of Roger Vadim's films. Luis Buñuel's Diary of a Chambermaid (1964), and Octave Mirbeau's original novel were said to be particular influences on Woman on the Night Train.

In their Japanese Cinema Encyclopedia: The Sex Films, Thomas and Yuko Mihara Weisser give Woman on the Night Train a rating of three out of four stars. They judge the film's weakness to be the rambling and far-fetched plot, but they write that this is compensated for by Tanaka's visuals and camera work, which they call, "some of the best in any pink film". They also note the welcome influence of French cinema on Tanaka's style. They single out the flashback scene in which the father seduces the maid as indicative of Tanaka's visual flair. Rather than staging the scene in a mundane bedroom setting, Tanaka makes the seduction more shocking by filming it among the stuffy, professorial father's books and papers in his study.

Allmovie judges Woman on the Night Train "memorable", "[s]tylish and absorbing", and one of Nikkatsu's best entries in the softcore genre of this period. They note that this film set a high standard against which Tanaka's later work often seemed lesser in comparison.

AvailabilityWoman on the Night Train was released theatrically in Japan on July 19, 1972. It was released on DVD in Japan on September 22, 2006 as part of Geneon's fifth wave of Nikkatsu Roman porno'' series.

Bibliography

English

Japanese

Notes

1972 films
Films directed by Noboru Tanaka
1970s Japanese-language films
Nikkatsu films
Nikkatsu Roman Porno
Rail transport films
1970s Japanese films